Kenneth Ellis (29 May 1948 – 1992) was an English footballer who played in the Football League for Hartlepool and Darlington. He also played in Belgium for Racing Jet and AS Oostende, and in English non-league football for Scarborough and Goole Town. He played as either defender or forward.

Notes

References

1948 births
1992 deaths
Footballers from Sunderland
English footballers
Association football defenders
Association football forwards
Scarborough F.C. players
Hartlepool United F.C. players
Racing Jet Wavre players
Darlington F.C. players
Goole Town F.C. players
English Football League players
English expatriate sportspeople in Belgium
Expatriate footballers in Belgium
Date of death missing
English expatriate footballers